Arkansas Twister is a wooden roller coaster at Magic Springs and Crystal Falls amusement park in Hot Springs, Arkansas. Originally opening in 1978 as The Roaring Tiger at Circus World theme park, the roller coaster was purchased in 1991 by Magic Springs, where it reopened as Arkansas Twister on May 30, 1992. The ride was also known as "Florida Hurricane" and "Michael Jackson's Thrill Coaster" over the years. Magic Springs purchased the ride from Boardwalk and Baseball for $10,000, and relocation costs brought the total investment to roughly $900,000.

History
The roller coaster made its debut in 1978 as The Roaring Tiger at Circus World in Haines City, Florida. Designed by Don Rosser & Associates and renowned coaster engineer Bill Cobb, the ride cost $2.3 million to construct using over a half-million feet of Douglas fir lumber. It was famously known as a personal favorite of celebrity Michael Jackson, who visited the park frequently in the 1980s to ride.

As Circus World changed ownership several times over the years, the roller coaster was renamed briefly to "Michael Jackson's Thrill Coaster" and eventually to "Florida Hurricane" when the park reopened as Boardwalk and Baseball in 1987. Boardwalk and Baseball closed shortly thereafter in 1990, and its rides were either demolished or sold to the highest bidder. Magic Springs and Crystal Falls purchased the Florida Hurricane for $10,000 in 1991, and spent close to $900,000 relocating the ride.

On May 30, 1992, the roller coaster opened to the public as "Arkansas Twister" at Magic Springs amusement park in Hot Springs, Arkansas. For the 2002 season, the park invested $2 million restoring the roller coaster to its original condition when it was located in Florida, modifying the "dips" to Cobb's original specifications.

Ride experience
The ride begins as the train exits the station and immediately enters the  lift hill. After reaching its peak, the train drops  at a 45-degree angle and banks slightly left as it elevates into a short hill, providing riders significant lateral g-force. The track straightens as the train makes a second descent into another short hill which produces an "air-time" experience. The third hill is followed by a steep climb into the ride's 180-degree turnaround that features brakes to slow the train. On its way back, the train descends from the turnaround into a series of two shorter hills, the second of which banks to the right at its crest. The following hill is larger and sits directly beside the roller coaster's lift hill, with wooden supports surrounding riders as they pass through. The ride's finale features two very short hills and another 180-degree turnaround before the coaster meets the final brake run and returns to the station.

References

External links 
 Official page
 Arkansas Twister at RCDB
 Florida Hurricane at RCDB

Roller coasters in Arkansas
Buildings and structures in Hot Springs, Arkansas
Magic Springs and Crystal Falls
1978 establishments in Florida
1990 disestablishments in Florida
1992 establishments in Arkansas
Roller coasters in Florida